Yi Yun-yong (August 19, 1890 – October 15, 1975) was a South Korean politician. He was the acting prime minister of South Korea following Chang Myon.

Biography

Early life and activism
Yi was born in 1890 in Nyongbyon County, and his art name was Baeksa (白史). In 1916, he became a pastor. While working as a pastor for the Sinchang church, he was arrested for leading lectures for korean independence and served jailtime of 1 year and two months. In 1936, he was against the unification of korean churches with the Japanese churches, fearing the dissolution of korean churches by the japanese authorities. In the context of the Pacific wars, he was fired from his pastor post.

Post-liberation
Directly after liberation of korea in the August 1945, he became the vice president of the Pyongyang people's committee and participated in the founding of the Korean Social Democratic Party(then known as the Korean Democratic Party, though when he defected to South Korea, the party came with him) with Cho Man-sik. He defected to South Korea in February 1946 after it was revealed that he sent a secret letter to Seoul regarding his opinions of being against the trusteeship decision.
 In 1948 he became one of the founding members of the South Korean parliament. He was appointed as a Minister without portfolio in 1952 and inaugurated as principal for Sinheung college(which were to be Kyung Hee University) and became the head of committee for the anti communist reunification union in July of the same year. He was elected as head of the Korean democratic party in 1958.In 1961 he was against the extension of military rule.

Notes

References

Prime Ministers of South Korea
1890 births
1975 deaths
Members of the National Assembly (South Korea)
Korean Social Democratic Party politicians